Faux mouvement, an album by Autour de Lucie, was released in 2001 on the Nettwerk label. Many of the songs also appear remixed on their 2001 remix compilation Vu par ....

Track listing
 "Je Reviens" – 6:10
 "Je Suis un Balancier" – 6:47
 "Sans Commentaire" – 2:51
 "Vide" – 3:46
 "Chanson De L'Arbre" – 4:48
 "Lent" – 4:12
 "Corps Etrangers" – 4:41
 "La Condition Pour Aimer" – 3:01
 "La Contradiction" – 4:56
 "Le Salon" – 3:57
 "Le Dernier Mot" – 5:03

References

 

Autour de Lucie albums
2001 albums